"Bull Rider" is a song written by Rodney Crowell and originally recorded by Johnny Cash for his 25th anniversary album Silver (1979).

Released as a single in 1980 (Columbia 1-11237, with "Lonesome to the Bone" from the same album on the opposite side), the song reached number 66 on U.S. Billboard country chart.

Track listing

Charts

References

External links 
 "Bull Rider" on the Johnny Cash official website

Johnny Cash songs
1979 songs
1980 singles
Songs written by Rodney Crowell
Columbia Records singles